A referendum on the new constitution or organic law of Spain was held in Spanish Sahara on 14 December 1966 as part of the wider Spanish referendum. The Organic Law of the State was approved by 94.6% of voters in Spanish Sahara and 98.1% of voters overall.

Results

References

1966 referendums
1966 in Spanish Sahara
Referendums in Western Sahara
Referendums in Spain
Francoist Spain